Cangola is an Angolan town and commune that is located in the province of  Uíge. It is part of the municipality Alto Cauale. The commune had a population of 53,720 in 2014.

References 

Populated places in Uíge Province